Hans von Essen may refer to:

 Hans Henric von Essen (1755–1824), Swedish officer, courtier and statesman
 Hans Olof von Essen (1900–1973), Finnish officer and equestrian